The following are a list of Le Mans Prototypes (LMP) race cars, running today, and in the past.

(Note: Some car chassis may have raced in multiple LMP classes through its lifetime or through different setups by teams. These cars are listed in every class they participated in.)

References 

Le Mans

24 Hours of Le Mans